Ozeville is a commune in the Manche department in Normandy in north-western France.

The town was mentioned in the D-Day diary of Capt Walter Marchand, US Army, Medical Corps.  Ozeville was assaulted on 8 June (D-Day+2) and finally taken on 13 June (D-Day+7) by the Allied Forces.

See also
Communes of the Manche department

References

Communes of Manche